Love's Everlasting Courage is a 2011 American made-for-television Christian drama film. It premiered  October 1, 2011 and is the second prequel of the Love Comes Softly series of Hallmark Channel films which depicts life in the mid-to-late 19th century. It has the alternate title Love's Resounding Courage.

Plot
During a drought in the 1800s, Clark Davis is having difficulty making payments on a loan. His well is dry and he is unable to find water while drilling other wells. Clark is transporting water from a river for his livestock and garden. His wife Ellen takes a job as a seamstress to help pay off the loan. She gets afflicted with scarlet fever and dies. Their daughter Missie causes a fire and burns down part of their cabin. The movie ends with Clark receiving financial help from his parents Lloyd and Irene.

Cast 

Wes Brown as Clark Davis
Bruce Boxleitner as Lloyd Davis
Cheryl Ladd as Irene Davis
Julie Mond as Ellen Davis
Morgan Lily as Missie Davis
Willow Geer as Sarah
Tyler Jacob Moore as Ben Graham
Kirk B.R. Woller as Bruce Conner
James Eckhouse as Mr. Harris
Courtney Marmo as Laura

References

External links
 
 Love Comes Softly Series site at Hallmark Channel

Love Comes Softly (TV film series)
2011 television films
2011 films
2011 drama films
Hallmark Channel original films
Television prequel films
Television sequel films
Films set in the 1800s
Films about Christianity
Films directed by Bradford May
American drama television films
2010s American films
American prequel films